Palacholla Venkata Rangaiah Naidu (also spelled as P.V. Rangayya Naidu) (born 6 April 1933) was a member of the 10th Lok Sabha of India. He represented the Khammam constituency of Andhra Pradesh. He served his country in the Indian Police Service as a Director General of Police before joining politics. He was decorated twice for meritorious service to the country of India. In 1972 Naidu was awarded the Indian Police Medal and in 1983 he was awarded the President's Police Medal for Distinguished Service. He served as a Union Minister in the government of India during the prime ministership of P.V. Narasimha Rao, from 1991 to 1996. He served as the Deputy Minister for Telecommunications and Minister of State for Power and Water Resources. He has been a member of the Indian National Congress party since his retirement from the Indian Police Service.

External links
 Official biographical sketch in Parliament of India website

1933 births
Living people
Indian National Congress politicians from Andhra Pradesh
Telugu politicians
Telangana politicians
India MPs 1991–1996
Indian Police Service officers
Lok Sabha members from Andhra Pradesh
People from East Godavari district